Poschiavo railway station is a railway station in the municipality of Poschiavo, in the Swiss canton of Graubünden. It is located on the Bernina line of the Rhaetian Railway. The station lies just outside the village of Poschiavo, and is linked to it by an avenue at right angles to the line.

The station opened on 1 July 1908 with the opening of the Tirano to Poschiavo section of the Bernina line. The station building dates from 1962, and the station was modernised and remodelled between 2016 and 2019.

The station has a five-story station building on one side of the line, whilst on the opposite side of the line is the principal depot of the Bernina line, responsible for maintaining the 1000 V DC rolling stock used on the line, with several lines between them. Since the recent remodelling, only the line nearest the station building is served by a raised and widened platform. A stretch of double track immediately to the north of the station, and a passing loop to the south, offer the ability for trains to pass each before or after calling at the platform.

Services 
The following services stop at Poschiavo:

 Regio: hourly service between St. Moritz and Tirano.

References

External links 
 
 

Railway stations in Graubünden
Rhaetian Railway stations
Poschiavo
Railway stations in Switzerland opened in 1908